The Belo River is a river of Paraná state in southeastern Brazil. Formed by the merger of the Marrecas and São Francisco rivers, and flowing into the Ivaí River, it is only about 5km long.

See also
List of rivers of Paraná

References

Rivers of Paraná (state)